Atomic Dog is a 1998 science fiction horror film directed by Brian Trenchard-Smith and starring Daniel Hugh Kelly and Cindy Pickett. The story tells of a dog who, after being exposed to radiation, begins the search to identify himself with a pack.

Plot 
A man befriends a male puppy of about three months old that lives in a nuclear plant. One day, an accident causes the people working in the plant to abandon it. However, the man has no chance of retrieving the puppy, who has to stay inside.

A few years later, a family moves into the town along with their female dog. Somehow the puppy, now an atomic dog, with an enhanced sense of smell, strength and memory only given to wolves, manages to escape from the plant and mates with the female dog, producing a litter of puppies. However, upon delivering, the female dog perishes, and is buried in the backyard.

The family gives most of the puppies away, but keep two of them. However, the dog himself tries to retrieve them, and launches himself on an attack towards those humans he sees as threatening, starting with the local veterinarian. The family itself becomes involved, and the dog chases them to the plant. Here he leaps toward a young girl who is in danger of being killed by falling metal tubes. The dog is mortally injured by the falling metal tubes and dies while the girl pets him. He is buried beside his consort.

Production
Trenchard-Smith said that he got the job directing the film because of his experience handling animals on the Tarzán TV series.

References

External links

 

1998 television films
1998 films
Films about dogs
American science fiction horror films
American science fiction thriller films
1998 horror films
1990s science fiction horror films
1990s science fiction thriller films
USA Network original films
Films directed by Brian Trenchard-Smith
1990s English-language films
1990s American films